Throscidae is a family of elateroid beetles found worldwide (except New Zealand) with around 150 species in 5 extant genera. The larvae are soil-dwelling, siphoning fluid from mycorrhizae attached to trees. The adults are short-lived, with the adult males being noted for a complex mating dance. Like some other elateroids, they are capable of clicking.

Genera
 Aulonothroscus Horn, 1890
 Cryptophthalma Cobos, 1982
 Pactopus LeConte, 1868
 Potergus Bonvouloir, 1871
 Trixagus Kugelann, 1794

Fossil genera 

 †Jaira Muona 1993 Baltic amber, Eocene
 †Potergosoma Kovalev and Kirejtshuk 2013 Lebanese amber, Early Cretaceous (Barremian)
 †Rhomboaspis Kovalev and Kirejtshuk 2013  Lebanese amber, Barremian
†Trixagosoma Li et al., 2020 Burmese amber, Myanmar, Late Cretaceous (Cenomanian)
 †Tyrannothroscus Muona 2019 Baltic amber, Eocene
†Captopus Li, Huang & Cai, 2021 Burmese amber, Myanmar, Cenomanian
†Electrothroscus Li, Huang & Cai, 2021 Burmese amber, Myanmar, Cenomanian
†Pseudopactopus Li, Huang & Cai, 2021 Burmese amber, Myanmar, Cenomanian

References

Further reading

 
 
 
 
 
 
 
 
 
 
 

Elateroidea
Beetle families